The N-(2C)-fentanyl series, is the 2C family coupled with fentanyl.

See also
 List of fentanyl analogues

References

 
Chemical classes of psychoactive drugs
Phenethylamines